Others or The Others may refer to:

Fictional characters
 Others (A Song of Ice and Fire), supernatural creatures in the fictional world of George R. R. Martin's fantasy series A Song of Ice and Fire
 Others (Lost), mysterious inhabitants of a strange island in the South Pacific in the television series Lost
 Others (Night Watch), a fictional group of people with supernatural abilities in Sergey Lukyanenko's Watches novel pentalogy
 The Others (Vok), a character from the Beast Wars franchise
 The Others, a reference to Cro-Magnon peoples in Jean M. Auel's Earth's Children series
 The Others, a group of allies of Aquaman in comics, introduced in 2012 and featured in a 2014 series
 The Others, the Ancients who have achieved Ascension in the Stargate universe
 The Others, a series of alien extraterrestrial species from The 5th Wave novels and film

Films 
 The Others (1974 film), a 1974 film by the Argentinian director Hugo Santiago
 The Others (1997 film), a 1997 film by Travis Fine
 The Others (2001 film), a 2001 film by Alejandro Amenábar, starring Nicole Kidman

Literature 
 Others, a 1999 novel by James Herbert
 Others: A Magazine of the New Verse, a literary magazine edited by Alfred Kreymborg
 The Others, a modern fantasy series by American author Anne Bishop
 The Others, the first novel of a 1990–1993 trilogy by Margaret Wander Bonanno

Music

Groups and labels
 Others group of artists, a group of modernist artists founded in the beginning of the 20th century
 The Others (American band), a garage rock band active in the 1960s
 The Others (band), a British rock band

Albums and songs
 The Others (Dukes of Windsor album), 2006
 "The Others" (song), a 2006 song by the Dukes of Windsor
 The Others (Miyavi album), 2015
 The Others (Rosemary's Sons album)
 The Others (The Others album), 2005

Television 
 The Others (TV series), a 2000 horror series
 "The Others", a season 4 episode of the TV series Andromeda

See also 
 Another (disambiguation)
 Indefinite pronoun, a pronoun that refers to non-specific beings, objects, or places
 Other (disambiguation)